Andrew Sawford (born 15 March 1976) is a British politician who served as Member of Parliament (MP) for Corby from 2012 to 2015. A member of the Labour and Co-operative parties, he was a Shadow Minister for Communities and Local Government from 2013 to 2015.

Early life and career
Sawford was born in Desborough, Northamptonshire on 15 March 1976 to Phil and Rosemary Sawford. He was educated at a comprehensive school. He went on to study history at Durham University and graduated in 1997.

Following university, Sawford worked in Parliament for the then-Corby MP Phil Hope. He was a councillor and Cabinet Member on Dartford Borough Council in Kent from 1999 to 2003 representing Littlebrook Ward. Sawford also worked for the Local Government Association (LGA).

From 2003 to 2007 he was director of Connect Public Affairs advising local authorities and organisations such as the National Association of Local Councils (NALC) and the Association of Police Authorities (APA). He was from 2008 to 2012 chief executive of the Local Government Information Unit (LGiU), a London-based thinktank and registered charity.

Parliamentary career 
In October 2011, Sawford was selected to contest the marginal Corby constituency for Labour at the next general election. Following the resignation of incumbent Conservative Louise Mensch in 2012, he won Corby at the subsequent by-election which became the first Labour by-election gain since 1997.

Sawford sat on the Communities and Local Government Committee from 2012 to 2013. He was appointed as a Shadow Minister for Communities and Local Government, responsible for local government, in October 2013.

He proposed a bill under the Ten Minute Rule that would allow the public sector to bid against private sector providers for control over rail franchises. Sawford also proposed a Private Member's Bill on zero hours contracts.

Sawford was defeated by Conservative Tom Purseglove at the 2015 general election, who won with a similar vote margin to Mensch's result in 2010.

Post-parliamentary career 
After Parliament, Sawford became chief executive of Connect Communications, and later led a management buy-out to take ownership of the business. In June 2019 it was announced that Connect had acquired Stratagem, a Belfast-based public affairs agency. He also serves on the board of the Public Relations and Communications Association, and is a governor of the Kettering Buccleuch Academy.

Personal life 
His father, Phil Sawford, served as Labour MP for Kettering, a neighbouring constituency to Corby, from 1997 to 2005.

References

External links
Andy Sawford: Labour and Co-operative MP for Corby and East Northamptonshire

Living people
People from Desborough
Alumni of Grey College, Durham
Labour Co-operative MPs for English constituencies
UK MPs 2010–2015
1976 births
Councillors in Kent
People from Kettering